Sweet Exorcist may refer to:
 Sweet Exorcist (album), sixth studio album by Curtis Mayfield, released in 1974
 Sweet Exorcist (band), a British band project by Richard H. Kirk and Richard Barratt